Clay County is a county in the U.S. state of Nebraska. As of the 2010 United States Census, the population was 6,542. Its county seat is Clay Center. The county was formed in 1855, and was organized in 1871. It was named for Henry Clay, a member of the United States Senate from Kentucky, who went on to become United States Secretary of State.

In the Nebraska license plate system, Clay County is represented by the prefix 30 (it had the 30th-largest number of vehicles registered in the county when the license plate system was established in 1922).

Geography

Major highways

  U.S. Highway 6
  Nebraska Highway 14
  Nebraska Highway 41
  Nebraska Highway 74

Adjacent counties

 York County – northeast
 Fillmore County – east
 Thayer County – southeast
 Nuckolls County – south
 Webster County – southwest
 Adams County – west
 Hamilton County – north

Protected areas

 Alberding Lagoon National Wildlife Management Area
 Bluewing Wildlife Management Area
 Eckhardt Lagoon National Wildlife Management Area
 Green Wing State Wildlife Management Area
 Hansen Lagoon National Wildlife Management Area
 Harms Federal Waterfowl Production Area
 Hultine Federal Waterfowl Production Area
 Kissinger Basin State Wildlife Management Area
 Lange Lagoon National Wildlife Management Area
 Massie Federal Waterfowl Production Area
 Meadowlark Federal Waterfowl Production Area
 Moger Lagoon National Wildlife Management Area
 Sandpiper Federal Waterfowl Production Area
 Schuck Federal Waterfowl Production Area
 Smith Lagoon National Wildlife Management Area
 White Front Wildlife Management Area

Demographics

As of the 2000 United States Census, there were 7,039 people, 2,756 households, and 1,981 families in the county. The population density was 12 people per square mile (5/km2). There were 3,066 housing units at an average density of 5 per square mile (2/km2). The racial makeup of the county was 97.57% White, 0.17% Black or African American, 0.31% Native American, 0.30% Asian, 1.24% from other races, and 0.41% from two or more races. 3.48% of the population were Hispanic or Latino of any race. 49.4% were of German, 7.2% English, 7.2% American, 5.4% Swedish and 5.3% Irish ancestry.

There were 2,756 households, out of which 32.90% had children under the age of 18 living with them, 63.70% were married couples living together, 5.50% had a female householder with no husband present, and 28.10% were non-families. 25.70% of all households were made up of individuals, and 13.10% had someone living alone who was 65 years of age or older. The average household size was 2.52 and the average family size was 3.03.

The county population contained 27.30% under the age of 18, 5.90% from 18 to 24, 25.30% from 25 to 44, 23.60% from 45 to 64, and 18.00% who were 65 years of age or older. The median age was 40 years. For every 100 females, there were 95.10 males. For every 100 females age 18 and over, there were 95.00 males.

The median income for a household in the county was $34,259, and the median income for a family was $39,541. Males had a median income of $28,321 versus $19,870 for females. The per capita income for the county was $16,870. About 8.50% of families and 10.40% of the population were below the poverty line, including 13.40% of those under age 18 and 6.60% of those age 65 or over.

Communities

Cities

 Clay Center (county seat)
 Edgar
 Fairfield
 Harvard
 Sutton

Villages

 Deweese
 Glenvil
 Ong
 Saronville
 Trumbull

Census-designated place
 Inland

Unincorporated communities
 Eldorado
 Verona

Townships

 Edgar
 Eldorado
 Fairfield
 Glenvil
 Harvard
 Inland
 Leicester
 Lewis
 Logan
 Lone Tree
 Lynn
 Marshall
 School Creek
 Sheridan
 Spring Ranch
 Sutton

Politics
Clay County voters are reliably Republican. In only one national election since 1936 has the county selected the Democratic Party candidate.

See also
 National Register of Historic Places listings in Clay County, Nebraska

References

External links

 Andreas' History of the State of Nebraska - Clay County

 
Nebraska counties
Hastings Micropolitan Statistical Area
1871 establishments in Nebraska
Populated places established in 1871